The Pucciniomycetes (formerly known as the Urediniomycetes) are a class of fungi in the Pucciniomycotina subdivision of the Basidiomycota. The class contains 5 orders, 21 families, 190 genera, and 8016 species. It includes several important plant pathogens causing forms of fungal rust.

Characteristics
Pucciniomycetes develop no basidiocarp, karyogamy occurs in a thick-walled resting spore (teliospore), and meiosis occurs upon germination of teliospore. They have simple septal pores without membrane caps and disc-like spindle pole bodies. Except for a few species, the basidia, when present, are transversally septate. Mannose is the major cell-wall carbohydrate, glucose; fucose and rhamnose are the less prevalent neutral sugars; and xylose is not present.

References

Basidiomycota classes
Pucciniomycotina